Benjamin Ferrers (–1732) was an English portrait painter.

Life

Christened in late 1667 in Cookham, Berkshire, Ferrers was deaf from his birth and appears to have lived in Westminster. An account record of a court case in 1720 records:
 He was related to William Beveridge, bishop of St. Asaph. Beveridge refused to sit for a portrait during his lifetime, but following his death at Westminster on 5 March 1706–7, Ferrers painted one from his corpse. The picture, which is in the Bodleian Library at Oxford, was engraved by William Sherwin (both in mezzotint and line),  by Michael van der Gucht as a frontispiece to Beveridge's works, and by Trotter.

Ferrers also painted a picture of the Court of Chancery under Lord Chancellor Macclesfield, which included portraits of Macclesfield, Sir Philip Yorke and Sir Thomas Pengelly. This picture was owned by Dr. Lort of Cambridge, who gave it to the Earl of Hardwicke, and at the 5th Earl of Hardwicke's 1888 sale of pictures at Wimpole Hall it was bought by the National Portrait Gallery. His painting Three Ladies of the Leman Family and their Dogs on a Terrace (1728) is in the collection of the Tate Gallery

Ferrers painted a portrait of Thomas Cockman, Master of University College, Oxford, his brother John Cockman, and five Fellows of the college. The painting remained in the Cockham family until 2008, when it was auctioned at Sotheby's and acquired by University College.

Ferrers died in 1732; a Latin panegyric on him was written by his friend, Vincent Bourne, of Westminster School.

References

Sources

External links

1732 deaths
English portrait painters
18th-century English painters
English male painters
People from Westminster
Deaf artists
English deaf people
Year of birth uncertain
18th-century English male artists